The 2011 New Era Pinstripe Bowl, the second edition of the game, was a post-season American college football bowl game, held on December 30, 2011 at Yankee Stadium in the Bronx, New York as part of the 2011–12 NCAA Bowl season.

The game, was telecast at 3:20 p.m. ET on ESPN.  The Rutgers Scarlet Knights from the Big East Conference defeated the Iowa State Cyclones from the Big 12 Conference by a score of 27–13.

Teams

Rutgers

Iowa State

Game summary

Scoring

Statistics

Source:

References

External links
 Box score at ESPN

2011–12 NCAA football bowl games
2011
2011
2011
2011 in sports in New York City
December 2011 sports events in the United States
2011 Pinstripe Bowl